The 2007 Parramatta Eels Season was the 61st in the club's history. They competed in the NRL's 2007 Telstra Premiership, finishing the regular season in 5th position, and came within one match of the grand final only to be knocked out by eventual premiers, Melbourne Storm, who would later be stripped of this title after being found guilty of salary cap breaches.

Summary
Under new coach Michael Hagan, Parramatta saw a great performance in season 2007, spending most of the season in third place (behind the Storm and Manly) before a late season form slump, only stopped with a huge 68-22 demolition of defending premiers Brisbane saw them settle for fifth position at the end of the season. In the first week of the finals, they defeated the New Zealand Warriors away, 12–10 to set up a huge clash with arch-rivals Canterbury the following week. In an incident-filled match at ANZ Stadium in front of 50,621, Parramatta ran out 25–6 winners gaining revenge for their infamous preliminary final loss to Canterbury in the 1998 NRL season.

The win booked them a preliminary final clash with Minor Premiers Melbourne Storm. In a gruelling match at Melbourne's Telstra Dome, the Storm eventually won 26–10 ending Parramatta's 2007 season, one win away from their first Grand Final appearance since 2001. Later it was revealed by the NRL that the Melbourne Storm had in fact breached the salary cap that season, and they were stripped of their minor premiership and their title for the 2007 season. Parramatta spent most of the season inside the top four, however a patch of poor form late in the season saw them finish fifth despite a last round 68-22 thrashing of the Brisbane Broncos at home. Late season losses to Newcastle, Cronulla, Melbourne and St. George Illawarra proved costly.

Standings

Fixtures

Home and away season

Finals series

Players and staff
The playing squad and coaching staff of the Parramatta Eels for the 2007 NRL season as of 27 December 2006.

Statistics

Awards
Michael Cronin clubman of the year award: Ian Hindmarsh
Ken Thornett Medal (Players' player): Nathan Hindmarsh
Jack Gibson Award (Coach's award): Luke Burt
Eric Grothe Rookie of the Year Award: Krisnan Inu

References

Parramatta Eels seasons
Parramatta Eels season